SingStar is a competitive karaoke game for the PlayStation 3, and is a follow-up to the PlayStation 2 SingStar series. SingStar is developed by London Studio and published by Sony Computer Entertainment. This is the first SingStar game for the PS3.

Features
Unlike most previous SingStar games, SingStar for the PlayStation 3 features the ability to remove vocals. The songs feature the original music artist, and can be adapted from a single track master as with previous versions. SingStar then attempts to digitally remove the vocals from the track. The game will also allow users to fade out the vocal track once it detects the user singing, and return it if the user stops. The technology is unable to work on some songs due to the way they were mixed during recording.

The game shipped with 30 songs on disc, with the ability to download more songs from the online SingStore. The SingStore initially launched with 41 songs, including selected songs from the PS2 back catalogue, with more songs to be added regularly. The downloads feature the entire music video, and are in high definition where available.

My SingStar Online is the online component of SingStar. The idea for My SingStar Online was inspired by people uploading photos and videos of SingStar parties to websites such as Flickr and YouTube. The game could record photos and videos of players singing with the PlayStation Eye and the PS2 EyeToy, then be saved to the PlayStation's HDD or uploaded to the My SingStar Online network. Users could able to rate each other's performances and leave comments on their profiles.

Existing SingStar-brand USB microphones are compatible with the new game. Wireless Bluetooth microphones were under development but weren't ready in time for the launch, as originally promised. The newer Wireless microphones were released in March 2009, using a USB receiver to communicate with the microphones and not a bluetooth connection as previously stated.

Track lists
Tracks that were demonstrated at E³ 2006, but do not appear on the final track list, are: Avril Lavigne's "Complicated", Coldplay's "Speed of Sound", Culture Club's "Karma Chameleon", Franz Ferdinand's "Do You Want To", Marilyn Manson's "Personal Jesus", Queen's "Don't Stop Me Now", Soft Cell's "Tainted Love" and The Darkness's "I Believe in a Thing Called Love".

Also, David Bowie's "Let's Dance", Franz Ferdinand's "Do You Want To", Pixies's "Here Comes Your Man" and Queens of the Stone Age's "Go with the Flow" were on the provisional track list for SingStar PS3.

Many of these were available (for an additional charge) from the SingStore.

On disc
The following table lists songs available on SingStar for the PlayStation 3 video game console. Country of release is indicated by two-letter country codes. For titles which were localised for multiple markets, songs are either indicated as present ("Yes") or absent ("No") in the track list for each localised version.

Available for purchase on SingStore

Reception

SingStar received "generally favorable" reviews from critics, according to review aggregator Metacritic.

References

External links
 Official SingStar site
 SingStar VIP Lounge
 

2007 video games
EyeToy games
Karaoke video games
London Studio games
Multiplayer and single-player video games
PlayStation 3 games
PlayStation 4 games
PlayStation Eye games
SingStar
Sony Interactive Entertainment games
Video games developed in the United Kingdom
Video games with downloadable content